The Bayer designations c Carinae and C Carinae are distinct.

for c Carinae, see HD 76728
for C Carinae, see HD 69863

Carinae, c
Carina (constellation)